is a Japanese manga series written and illustrated by Sōichirō Yamamoto. To date, a total of nineteen volumes have been published, with sixteen volumes available in English. The series also had three spins-off, all collected in multiple tankōbon volumes.

Teasing Master Takagi-san
Teasing Master Takagi-san is written by Sōichirō Yamamoto. The series began serialization in Shogakukan's shōnen manga magazine supplement Monthly Shōnen Sunday Mini on June 12, 2013, and it moved to the main Monthly Shōnen Sunday magazine on July 12, 2016. As of March 2023, it has been collected in nineteen tankōbon volumes. In November 2017, Yen Press announced the acquisition of the manga for an English release in North America.

Tomorrow is Saturday
A spin-off manga series, titled , was serialized in the newspaper Yomiuri Chūkōsei Shimbun from November 7, 2014 to November 2015, and was collected into two tankōbon volumes. It was also adapted within the Karakai Jōzu no Takagi-san adaptation in 2018.

Koi ni Koisuru Yukari-chan
A second spin-off manga series, titled , was serialized in Monthly Shōnen Sunday from July 12, 2017 to April 11, 2020, and was collected into five tankōbon volumes.

Teasing Master (Former) Takagi-san
A third spin-off, titled , featuring an adult Takagi, now married to Nishikata, and their daughter, Chi, started in MangaONE app on July 15, 2017. It has been collected into eighteen tankōbon volumes.

Notes

References

External links

Lists of manga volumes and chapters